Phubbing is the habit of snubbing a physically present person in favour of a mobile phone. In May 2012, as part of a linguistic experiment by Macquarie Dictionary, the advertising agency behind the campaign, McCann, had invited a number of lexicographers, authors, and poets to coin a neologism to describe the behaviour. The word "phubbing," a portmanteau of phone and snubbing, was first described by McCann Group Account Director Adrian Mills, who was working with David Astle.
The term has appeared in media around the world and was popularized by the Stop Phubbing campaign created by McCann.

"Stop Phubbing" campaign
The Stop Phubbing campaign site, and related Facebook page, was part of an elaborate public relations effort designed to promote the Macquarie Dictionary of Australia. In the media, the website was originally credited by an Australian college student named Alex Haigh, who had been interning at McCann and was subsequently hired. A film, titled A Word is Born, describes the entire process and serves as an advertisement for the dictionary.

In the media
The campaign was picked up by numerous media outlets, notably those in the United Kingdom, Mexico, and Germany. The press reported on surveys showing statistics of the number of the people "phubbing," and published etiquette guides.

Research
In October 2015, media outlets (such as TODAY and Digital Trends) reported on a study by James A. Roberts, professor of marketing at Baylor University Hankamer School of Business, that was published in the journal "Computers In Human Behavior". The study consisted of two separate surveys of more than 450 U.S. adults to learn the relational effects of "phubbing" or partner phubbing. The survey found that 46.3 percent of respondents said their partners phubbed them, and 22.6 percent said it caused issues in their relationship. In an interview with Yahoo! Health, Roberts said, "We found that the ones that reported higher partner phubbing fought more with their partner and were less satisfied with their relationship than those who reported less phubbing."

Another study, published in 2022, found that people who reported being phubbed by their partner tended to have reduced romantic relationship quality.

Phubbing has also been linked to type of problematic social media use, as well as pathological internet use. This research suggests that phubbing may be a coping mechanism to help people to deal with their negative emotional states. Hence, making phubbing addictive in nature, and damaging based on repeated and sustained use.

See also

 Thumb tribe

References

Habits
Etiquette
Mobile phone culture
2012 neologisms